Vic Mather (9 December 1924 – 10 May 2009) was  a former Australian rules footballer who played with Footscray in the Victorian Football League (VFL).

Notes

External links 		
		
		
		
		
		
		
		
1924 births		
2009 deaths		
Australian rules footballers from Victoria (Australia)		
Western Bulldogs players